Alison Riske was the defending champion. Riske successfully defended the title, by beating 2017 champion Magdaléna Rybáriková 6–7(5–7), 6–2, 6–2 in the final.

Seeds

Draw

Finals

Top half

Bottom half

References

External Links
Main Draw

Surbiton Trophy – Singles